The 1978 SMU Mustangs football team represented Southern Methodist University (SMU) as a member of the Southwest Conference (SWC) during the 1978 NCAA Division I-A football season. Led by third-year head coach Ron Meyer, the Mustangs compiled an overall record 4–6–1 with a mark of 3–5 in conference play, tying for sixth place in the SWC.

With sagging attendance in recent years, including a dismal 6,918 against conference foe Rice, SMY athletic director Russ Potts orchestrated "Mustang Mania." Potts wanted to make SMU more visible in the Dallas area. Average attendance at SMU home games jumped from 25,644 in the previous year to 51,960 in the 1978 season. This was the highest average attendance for SMU home games since 1950.

Schedule

Roster

Team players in the NFL

References

SMU
SMU Mustangs football seasons
SMU Mustangs football